

Otto-Ernst Ottenbacher (18 November 1888 – 7 January 1975) was a German general in the Wehrmacht during World War II who commanded several corps. He was  a recipient of the Knight's Cross of the Iron Cross. Ottenbacher was wounded during the opening stages of the Battle of Kalinin in October 1941, when his plane was shot down by Soviet fighters. Severely burned, he was invalided back to Germany to recuperate.

Awards and decorations

 Knight's Cross of the Iron Cross on 13 August 1941 as Generalleutnant and commander of 36. Infanterie-Division

References

Citations

Bibliography

 

1888 births
1975 deaths
Lieutenant generals of the German Army (Wehrmacht)
German Army personnel of World War I
Recipients of the clasp to the Iron Cross, 1st class
Recipients of the Knight's Cross of the Iron Cross
People from Esslingen am Neckar
People from the Kingdom of Württemberg
Military personnel from Baden-Württemberg
Survivors of aviation accidents or incidents